Sustain our Africa is an African based public advocacy organisation and forum focused on increasing awareness, facilitating and promoting sustainable development intuitives in Africa.  The organisation's fundamental mission is to serve as a forum for the debate, discussion and dissemination of issues relating to sustainable development in an African context.  Sustain our Africa hosts an annual sustainability summit in October and runs a media platform to facilitate dialogue, spread information, and catalyse change.

References

Environment of Africa
International sustainability organizations